Jane P Booker (born 9 May 1956) is an English actress. She was born in Stratford-upon-Avon, Warwickshire, and has over 40 television roles to her credit.

One of her first roles was in James Ivory's "Hullabaloo Over Georgie and Bonnie's Pictures" (1978), which starred Dame Peggy Ashcroft and Larry Pine. In 1979 she played Nurse Sally in the mini-series Testament of Youth, Vera Brittain's classic memoir of World War I.

Selected filmography

TV
 Doctors: episode "Mr Right", (2011)
 Midsomer Murders: episode "The Creeper", (2009)
 Doctors: episode "All That Glitters", (2009)
 Casualty, (2007)
 Doctors: episode "A Secure Relationship", (2007)
 My Family, (2004, 2006)
 North and South, (2004), the dramatization of the Elizabeth Gaskell novel, as Mrs. Shaw
 Foyle's War, (2002)
 Jonathan Creek, (1999)
 Midsomer Murders: episode "Written in Blood", (1998)
 Coronation Street, (1996)
 Murder Most Horrid: episode "Mangez Merveillac", (1994)
 Get Back, (1992–1993), as Prudence Sweet
 The Darling Buds of May, (1991–1993)
 Murder Most Horrid: "Murder At Tea Time", (1991)
 Troublemakers, (1990)
 Inspector Morse, (1989)
 Colin's Sandwich, (1988–1989)
 Agatha Christie's Miss Marple: Nemesis, (1987), with Joan Hickson
 A Perfect Spy, (1987), nominated for four BAFTA awards, including Best Drama Series, and two Emmy Awards, including Outstanding Miniseries.
 Don't Wait Up, (1987–1988)
 Throb, (1986)
 First Among Equals, (1986), as Fiona Seymour
 Travelling Man, (1985)
 Agatha Christie's "Partners in Crime" episode "The Clergyman's Daughter", (1983)
 Nanny, (1982-1983), where she portrayed the Duchess of Broughton / Lady Charlotte Somerville,
 Pig in the Middle, (1981)
 Angels, (1979)

Film
Finding Neverland (2004), as Mrs. Darling
Priest of Love (1981)

Personal life
Booker married the actor James Fleet in 1985. The couple have one son together.

References

External links

Living people
1956 births
People from Warwickshire (before 1974)
English television actresses
20th-century English actresses